The discography for American hip hop musician Kutt Calhoun, who released four studio albums, including B.L.E.V.E. (2004), Feature Presentation (2008), Raw and Un-Kutt (2010), and Black Gold (2013), three EPs, singles, mixtapes, and music videos, with most of his studio releases charting on Billboard.

Studio albums

EPs

Mixtapes

Guest appearances

Music videos

References

External links
KCWaavyStore.com

Discographies of American artists
Hip hop discographies